NEHS or Nehs may refer to:

Schools
 National Experimental High School, Hsinchu, Taiwan
 New Egypt High School, New Jersey, United States 
 New Era High School, Panchgani, India
 Northeast High School (Philadelphia, Pennsylvania), United States 
 Nueva Ecija High School, Cabanatuan City, Nueva Ecija, Philippines

Other
 National Elementary Honor Society, for elementary students in the USA
 Non-exertional heat stroke, from excessive environmental heat
 Victor Nehs (1887–1949), American politician